Matthew Golombisky is/was a United States American and active bassist, composer, educator (Creer Es Crear, SSiiDS, IfCM, Hilldale School, SPACE), conductor (Tomorrow Music Orchestra, IfCM, Creer Es Crear), improviser, curriculum developer (SPACE, Mynah Music, IfCM, Creer Es Crear), arranger, orchestrator, sound designer, stage manager/production (Pitchfork Music Festival, Hideout Block Party, The Swell Season, Peter, Bjørn & John), radio DJ/producer (WNUR 89.3FM), organizer/presenter (Blank Tape Series, ears&eyes Festival), ideator (Clorox), and musical theatre writer & director (Bizzo!).

Matthew has lived and been active in music, festival, and film scenes in the Bay Area CA, Chicago, New Orleans, Buenos Aires, New York state, and Asheville, North Carolina, as well as toured the United States and Europe with bands such as IfCM, NOMO, Zing!, Jhelisa, GKduo, WATIV, QMRplus, more. He also directs the independent record label "ears&eyes Records", which represents bands such as James Davis' Beveled, Caroline Davis Quartet, Juan Pastor's Chinchano, Charles Rumback, Darts & Arrows, Quintopus, Silences Sumire, Maurice, Zing!, Pedway, James Davis Quintet, Tomorrow Music Orchestra, Algernon, among others and curated an annual music/arts/film festival under the same name.

His undergraduate studies at the University of North Carolina at Asheville led to a B.A. in Jazz Studies/Bass Performance with an emphasis on 20th Century Classical music & theory, graduating with the Award in Distinction in Music and graduate studies to a M.M. in Composition from the University of New Orleans after a brief stint at Northwestern University after Hurricane Katrina swept through New Orleans in August 2005.

He has taught performance, improvisation, composition, theory, recording techniques, and music marketing to children and adults for more than 18 years in schools and colleges across the nation. He joined the IfCM Collective to travel the US, teaching clinics to high school and college students his methods of composing, improvising and conducting. In 2013, he teamed up with like-minded musicians/educators John Nash, Patrick Liddell and Elisabeth Johnson and founded a not-your-typical-music-school school in Oakland CA to promote experiencing/learning music as a whole art form, as something relevant and exciting, called Mynah Music. Most recently, he became the Music Director and conductor of a youth orchestra in Buenos Aires, Argentina in a government funded program inspired by Venezuela's El Sistema.

Matthew's discography includes over 60 recordings featuring his performance, compositions, conducting, film scores, and/or production.

He continues to dedicate much energy to presenting wonderful, original and creative music through several groups including his 30 piece jazz/classical/rock ensemble, Tomorrow Music Orchestra, who most recently recorded for singer/songwriter Via Tania's latest release Via Tania with the Tomorrow Music Orchestra. He previously performed with electric jazz-rock quintet, Zing!, acoustic free improv trio, Pedway, drums and bass rock out, punk jazz duo, GKduo with longtime collaborator, Quin Kirchner, and jazz septet led by trombonists Jeb Bishop and Jeff Albert, Lucky 7s. In 2011, he teamed up with Chris Teal and his non-profit IfCM in Rochester NY and launched an education, audience, and community based version of Tomorrow Music Orchestra.

Golombisky was born and raised in Durham and Hillsborough, North Carolina.  He started playing bugle and cornet at an early age.  In middle school, he met an influential friend who sparked his interest in bass guitar, and in high school, played in the Honors Jazz Ensemble.  There he formed the Orange High Jazz Combo, which is still going strong today.

After high school, Golombisky attended the University of North Carolina at Asheville where he studied acoustic/electric bass performance, jazz, and classical music.  At UNC-A, he became the music department's hired music theory tutor.  He graduated with the award of Distinction in Music in May 2001.  He was also hired as an instructor and event organizer at The Asheville Music School where he taught private and group trumpet, bass, music theory and improvisation courses.

After graduation, he moved to New Orleans and quickly became a full-time working musician, eventually finding himself in twelve different groups at a time, several of which recorded full-length CDs and have played all over the US and Europe.  At any given point, he had 30 private students, several of which were accepted to the prestigious New Orleans Center for Creative Arts (NOCCA), aged anywhere from 4 to 75 years old, studying piano, bass, guitar, theory, composition, and improvisation.  He organized public concerts and recording sessions for many of his students.

In the spring of 2004, he started a Master's program at the University of New Orleans (UNO) in Music Composition with Dr. Jerry Sieg.  In August 2005, he was forced out of New Orleans because of Hurricane Katrina, and currently resides in Chicago where he is a steadily performing bassist, working composer and educator, continuing to play with several groups from New Orleans as well as newly formed groups based in Chicago.  In Chicago, he has put together a large ensemble consisting of over twenty performers, playing all-original and freshly composed music called the Tomorrow Music Orchestra.  Since its conception, they have released two CDs, Live @ Ice Factory and neon jesus garage.  He attended Northwestern in the fall of 2005 and completed his Master's of Music in Composition from UNO in May 2006.

He also directs the community collective known as ears&eyes, which "represents" bands such as Silences Sumire, Maurice, Box 3, Zing!, Pedway, James Davis Quintet, Algernon, among others and curates an annual music/arts/film festival under the same name.

Golombisky's "Determining What's Next", a slow movement for chamber orchestra, was premiered in Innsbruck, Austria in November 2005, performed at the Chicago Jazz Festival in 2006 with the Lucky 7s, curated the now annual music/film/arts festival, ears&eyes, and is the director of the collective music community, ears&eyes Records.

(partial) Discography

Key:
 bassist, # composer, % arranger, ~ art/design, = session work, & engineering

<2015>

"West Coast" Cuentos (post-production) - 
ears&eyes Records *#%~

"Via Tania with the Tomorrow Music Orchestra" Via Tania - 
Narooma Records #%=

<2013>

"Montana Fix" Gunnelpumpers - 
Spiritflake Music *#

"Passion Ball" Pedway - 
$ ears&eyes Records *&~

<2012>

"April Showers" EP Quintopus - 
ears&eyes Records *#&

"In New Orleans" Dan Andersen & Marco Katz - 
Dan Andersen Music *

<2011>

"Animal Pants" Animal Pants - 
Independent *%

"Subventure" Pedway - 
ears&eyes Records *&

"Live in Santa Fe" Zing! - 
ears&eyes Records *#%&

"galeria de la luz" Outshine Family - 
Black Maps *=

<2010>

"Darts & Arrows" Bill MacKay - 
Son of Fire Recordings *%

"The Silent World of Hector Mann" Duke Special - 
Reel to Reel Recordings *

<2009>

"The Spirits at Bell's" 
Jimmy Bennington/Perry Robinson Quartet - 
Cadence Jazz Records *#

"Pluto Junkyard" Lucky 7s - 
Clean Feed Records *

"Balkano" Balkano - 
Independent *

"The Process of Addiction Has Its Costs" Phillip Morris - 
(bass line sampled on Political Science) *

<2008>

"New Symphonics for Jeremy" Robin Boudreaux - 
Tipping Point *#

"Holiday for Vacationers" The Other Planets - 
ears&eyes/Attention Spaniel Records *

"Return is Selective" Silences Sumire - 
Ropeadope Digital =

"Lost to the Living" Daylight Dies - 
Candle Light Records *%=

"Jar Cell Dirge (EP)" Pedway - 
ears&eyes Records *#&~

"No Cross, No Crown" Amy Peters - 
(documentary film) sound track via
Tomorrow Music Orchestra, GKduo,
QMRplus, WATIV, The Other Planets

<2007>

"Magnetic Flux" Zing! - 
ears&eyes *%

"Uhzoid" QMRplus - 
ears&eyes Records *#%&~

"Corporate Whore" Amy Peters - 
(stop-motion film) #& watch

"Paperwork" a Gus Gavino film - 
(original music/sound design) #%&

"Farewell Darkness" Daniel J. Pico - 
(documentary film) *=

"Eat Your Fruits and Vegetables!" Diana Lawrence - 
Independent *=

"ITS TIME"  Chicago Junglebop Syndicate - 
IZM Records *

"Outspoken: Los Angeles" David Bianchi/Carl Sondrol - 
(documentary film) *= (sample)

<2006>

"Farragut" Lucky 7s - 
Lakefront Digital *#

"Live @ Ice Factory" Tomorrow Music Orchestra - 
ears&eyes Records *#%&~

"neon jesus garage"  Tomorrow Music Orchestra - 
ears&eyes Records *#%&~

"New Orleans/Katrina=Chicago+Santa Fe" Grilly Biggs - 
High Mayhem *#

"High Mayhem Festival 2005" (compilation) -
High Mayhem *#

"Eightballs in Angola" The Other Planets - 
Attention Spaniel *

"Introducing ::" GKduo - 
ears&eyes *#%&~

"backGammon" backGammon - 
Independent *#

<2005>

"LIVE!" QMRplus - 
ears&eyes *#%&~

"Baghdad Music Journal" WATIV - 
High Mayhem *#

"Dismantling Devotion" Daylight Dies - 
Candlelight Records =%

"High Mayhem Festival 2004" (compilation) - 
High Mayhem *

"No Bitch-Ass Hurricane Can Stop Us" EP, Grilly Biggs - 
Independent *#%~&

"RedShift" RedShift - 
Independent *#%&

(earlier)

"To Tide You Over" Grilly Biggs - 
Independent *#&~

"Live at Left Bank" Macy-Golombisky Duo - 
Independent *&~

Press|Print

"Montana Fix, from the Gunnelpumpers [is] instrumental music of the highest order...the record is intense, moody, introspective, groovy, transcendent, atmospheric, mind-expanding... a great collection of grooves that roam across the sonic horizon...the collective vibe of this group is stunning...inspired!", says JimmyDumps.com review.

"...each and every second is interesting and provocative," says babysue.com review on Montana Fix.

Bill Meyer (Chicago Reader) on The Spirit at Bell's:
"Golombisky and Daniel Thatcher, are equally essential to the album's novel sound. The two double bassists fill the space between Robinson's adroit, graceful maneuvers and Bennington's loose grooves and colorful fills with a rich assortment of tightly woven walking lines, darting solo forays, and out-of-tempo strums."

"...as the brainchild of bassist, composer and conductor Matthew Golombisky, TMO (as they're known)... the result is quite the aural and visual amusement, simultaneously artistic and intriguing. One minute they're pumping out a big-band sound before a completely natural-sounding Afrobeat seamlessly shakes its way into the ensemble. A playful yet serious blending of genres makes TMO an un-intimidating way to expose oneself to classical and traditional jazz blended with elements of rock. A word of caution: just sit back and enjoy it — because if you spend too much time trying to identify all the sounds, you'll just end up lost in the richness of it all." (Appearing as part of the Around the Coyote Fall Festival) 
– Jen Fischer (ChicagoInnerview)

Brad Walseth (jazzchicago.net) on Zing!'s Magnetic Flux:
"...bassist Golombisky and drummer Kirchner form a formidable tandem, anchoring these quickly mutating pieces while aggressively propelling them forward...it's as though a lunar explorer from Earth landed on a beach on some alien world with its enclosed package of musical samples melted together during the descent, warped it's true, but still clearly recognizable as music."

Lucky 7s Farragut is #10 on the 2006 WNUR Top 50 Records

Avant Music News, Best of 2013, Honorable Mention for Montana Fix by Gunnelpumpers.

"...alles echt, erdig und rhythmisch...wer spaB an instrumenten und ungewohnten kombis hat, kommt hier auf seine kosten...", says NONPOP review on Montana Fix.

Hilary Matheson (Daily Inter Lake) reports on IfCM with Golombisky teaching improvisation: here.

Chris Peterson (Hungry Horse News) reports on IfCM with Golombisky "igniting a new creative vibe...": here.

Neil Tesser (Chicago Reader) on Tomorrow Music Orchestra:
"In his thoughtfully crafted written passages, Golombisky employs this large palette with unusual care, mixing the colors sparingly and with a painterly attention to shadow and light, but individual voices carry through even during full-group improvisations."

Jay Collins (Signal To Noise magazine #45) on Farragut:
"Special mention must be given to Golombisky for his riveting 'It's Something to Try. For now, at least' [tune]...with its beautiful, yet raucous energy..."

Peter Margasak (Chicago Reader) on Darts & Arrows record "...they work hard to create a detailed ensemble setting, shaping unobtrusive grooves and harmonic shapes with the same restraint the guitarist applies to his melodic extrapolations."

Bruce Lee Gallanter (Downtown Music Gallery) on The Spirit at Bell's: 
"For this fine disc, Bennington hooks up with clarinet legend Perry Robinson plus strong two acoustic bassists...starts with both bassists strumming and plucking together cerebrally, slowly building as the clarinet quietly enters...both bassists do a fine job of providing the flow of events as they unfold and move in waves together...there is something natural and unforced about the way this disc evolves...it just feels right and feels good..."

Neil Tesser (Chicago Reader) on Zing!'s Magnetic Flux:
"On its debut disc, Magnetic Flux (released this summer), Golombisky hits the ground dancing: the opening track, "Boo Boo Bah Bah," jumps to his electric-bass countermelody, doubled by guitarist Dave Miller."

Filmmaker Amy Peters: "I needed music. Only a few things would work for the specific feel I was going for. It just so happened that I got some discs to review for my feature documentary and one musician had already stood out as being a possibility. Matthew Golombisky. Bingo. He not only had the PERFECT score on his sound resume, but he is super cool enough to let me use it!"

Vern (JazzWrap) on Zing!'s Magnetic Flux:
"'Afterwords' displays this richly through the what could almost be journey walking down a New Orleans street in the aftermath. The basslines from Golombisky are haunting and easily detached you from session to fill you emotions of sorrow and the hope that follows."

Michael Nastos (All Music Guide) on Zing!'s Magnetic Flux:
"A group that seemingly is capable of anything, it's remarkable what they have accomplished here, considering it's their debut recording... Zing! sounds poised to make big waves on the contemporary music landscape."

Forrest Dylan Bryant (JazzTimes magazine) on Pluto Junkyard Jan/Feb 2007 issue: "...live and raw. Neatly balancing abstraction with fat, chewy grooves, the band gleefully stomps through compositions pulling back occasionally for stark atmospherics or somber ensemble sections."

Grego Edwards (Cadence Magazine) on Farragut Feb '07:
"The ensemble plays a raucous, yet controlled form of Jazz that has some of the joy of old New Orleans style yet is thoroughly Post-Bop in its inflections...this is modern ensemble Jazz of the highest caliber. Grab this one!"

Bill Meyer (DownBeat magazine) on Farragut March 2007:
"...one moment their attractive melodies coast on vigorously swinging rhythms, the next they tumble in a free improv freefall." 3 1/2 stars

Debi Winston Bruzil (Yoga Chicago) on Darts & Arrows:
"...'Whispers' is a lovely haunting song with a slow and steady pace. Listening to it makes my heart open and soar."

Jay Collins (Signal To Noise) on Pluto Junkyard Spring 2007:
"It's a simply excellent album...beautiful, yet raucous energy."

Artist profile on Gapers Block by Laura Mayer, Oct. 24, 2008

Ken Waxman's (Jazz Word) review on Farragut: here

Lucky 7s Pluto Junkyard review on All About Jazz
Neil Tesser (Chicago Reader) on the 2nd Annual 
ears&eyes Festival, read: Dec. 6 2007

Nov. 2007 issue of Bass Player magazine
Larry Grenadier interview

Sept. 26 2007, Santa Fe Reporter
High Mayhem Festival review

Aug/Sept. '06 Matthew Lurie (TimeOut Chicago) on Lucky 7s

Steve Griffith (Paris Transatlantic Magazine) reviews Lucky 7s, February 2010 (Ctrl+F "Golo")

March 2007 issue of DownBeat Lucky 7s review by Bill Meyer

Fall 2006 issue of Zero Tolerance Gunnelpumpers article

Summer 2006 issue of Double Bassist magazine
Surviving Katrina article

Chicago Jazz Festival 2006 issue of TimeOut, Lucky 7s article

Spring 2006 issue of Signal to Noise, WATIV article

Antigravity (New Orleans magazine) article on QMRplus' Robin Boudreaux about his New Symphonics for Jeremy, with Golombisky on bass, June 2008

Jason (Live New Orleans) on a Grilly Biggs show, Feb '05:
"I'm not a fan of the five or six stringed bass. Just like I'm not fond of the hydrogen bomb. I think the human race can do enough damage with the atomic bomb...bassists should be able to anchor the music and create melodies with just four strings. But, I've seen the five or six string fall into the hands of musicians who used its wider range of tones for no good reason. They produced superfluous notes that cluttered the music. After Grilly Biggs bassist Golombisky's six string performance, my phobia is waning. ...luckily, [he] kept his lines simple. He copied the sparse melodies of vibraphonist Matthew McClimon, or he created a quick succession of notes that drummers...built on... while his supersonic strumming created the hint for a freakout. A wonderful caucophony. Grilly Biggs were masters of space."

Jason (Live New Orleans) on a Red Shift show, June '05:
"...of course, the challenge of the music and the amount of focus that's sometimes needed while listening to Jazz is the fun of it when you get it, when you can let go and roll with it. That apprehension disappeared when the Golombisky and McClimon started moving in exactly the same directions."

Jason (Live New Orleans) on a Red Shift show, June '05:
"...of course, the challenge of the music and the amount of focus that's sometimes needed while listening to Jazz is the fun of it when you get it, when you can let go and roll with it. That apprehension disappeared when the Golombisky and McClimon started moving in exactly the same directions."

Nov. 2007 issue of Bass Player (Larry Grenadier interview)
Spring 2006 issue of Signal to Noise (WATIV article)
Summer 2006 issue of Double Bassist (Chicago bassists/Surviving Katrina article)
Fall 2006 issue of Zero Tolerance (Gunnelpumpers article)
Chicago Jazz Festival 2006 issue of TimeOut (Lucky 7s article)

Current groups/bands
Tomorrow Music Orchestra – 20+ members (traditional chamber ensemble with addition of vibes, saxophones, guitar, and drum set); Chicago-based; www.earsandeyesrecords.com/tmo and www.myspace.com/tomorrowmusicorchestra
Golombisky-Kirchner Duo (GKduo) – MG: bass, likable noise, melodica, percussion, Quin Kirchner (QK): drums, tapes, samples, percussion; Chicago-based; www.myspace.com/golombiskykirchnerduo or www.gkduo.com
Lucky 7s – Jeb Bishop: trombone, Jeff Albert: trombone/tuba, Josh Berman: cornet, Keefe Jackson: tenor sax/bass clarinet, Jason Adasiewicz: vibes, MG: acoustic bass/effects, QK: drums; New Orleans/Chicago-based; www.lucky7s.org
WATIV – Will Thompson: piano/Rhodes/clarinet/computer, Jeremy Bleich: oud/melodcia/percussion, MG: bass/melodica/effects, Milton Villarrubia – drums/melodica; Jackson, Miss/Santa Fe/Chicago-based; www.wativ.com
ZING! – James Davis: trumpet, Caroline Davis (CD): alto sax, Dave Miller: guitar/effects, MG: electric bass/effects, QK – drums; Chicago-based; www.zingzingzing.com
Dirty Snow – James Davis: trumpet, CD: alto sax, Matthew McClimon (MM): vibes, MG: acoustic bass; Chicago-based; www.myspace.com/dirtysnowmusic
Red Shift – Tom Sandahl: guitar/keyboards, MM: vibes, MG: acoustic/electric bass/effects, QK: drums; Portland/Chicago-based; www.redshiftmusic.net
Grilly Biggs – MM: vibes, MG: acoustic/electric bass/effects, QK: drums/tapes, Milton Villarrubia: drums/sampler; Santa Fe/Chicago-based; www.grillybiggs.com
The Other Planets – Anthony Cuccia: percussion/vocals, Dr. Jimbo Walsh: guitar, Dan Oestreicher: bari/bass saxophone, MM: vibes, MG: electric bass/effects, QK: drums, Tim McFatter: tenor sax/keyboards; New Orleans/Chicago-based; www.theotherplanets.com
Gunnelpumpers – Doug Johnson: acoustic/electric contrabass/effects, Michael Hovnanian: contrabass/effects, MG: contrabass/effects, Doug Brush: tabla/percussion, Randy Farr: congas/percussion; Chicago-based; www.myspace.com/gunnelpumpers
backGammon – Jonathon Kirk: trombone/euphonium/computer, Casey Farina: made instruments/percussion/computer, Theron Humiston: guitar/computer, James Diomede: voice/effects, Dr. Stephen Syverud: piano, CD: alto sax, MG: acoustic bass/effects/computer; Evanston, IL-based; www.myspace.com/bkgmn
Ear To The Ground – Dave Rempis: tenor/bari sax, CD: alto sax, MG: acoustic bass, QK: drums; Chicago-based.
QMRplus – Robin Boudreaux: soprano/alto/tenor sax, MM: vibes, MG: acoustic bass, QK: drums; New Orleans/Chicago/Indiana-based; www.qmrplus.com
Pele's Electric Glow – Sam Macy: guitar, MM: vibes, MG: acoustic bass, QK: drums; Chicago-based; www.myspace.com/peleselectricglow
The Hall Monitors – David Polk: alto sax/computer, Brigham Hall: piano/computer, MG: electric bass/effects, QK: drums (Chicago), Simon Lott: drums (New Orleans); New Orleans/Chicago-based; www.thehallmonitors.com
Theory Anesthetic – Mandy Matz: keyboard/computer/voice, Walton Richmond: mandolin/guitar, MG: acoustic/electric bass/effects, QK: drums/samples; Chicago-based; www.theoryanesthetic.com
A Lott Moore Golombisky – Jason Moore: tenor sax, MG: electric bass/effects, Simon Lott: drums; Baton Rouge/Chicago-based.
Balkano – Bryan Pardo: clarinet/alto and tenor sax, James Davis: trumpet, Dave Miller: guitar, Diana Lawrence: voice, MG: bass, Joe Chellman: drums; Chicago-based.
Jack&Jezebel – MG: bass/computer/piano/etc.; Chicago-based; www.myspace.com/jackandjezebel
Steps (74) – Dave Marsalek: drums, Brian Niebuhr: trumpet, Joe Grez: tenor sax, Ray Pandocchi: tenor sax, L. Ziade: voice, Fred Krugel: guitar, Matt Nelson: keyboard, MC Philasoph: voice, Jbeatz: flute/voice, MG: acoustic/electric bass/effects; aka Chicago Junglebop Syndicate; Chicago-based; www.myspace.com/chicagojunglebop

References

External links
 ears&eyes Records

Living people
Year of birth missing (living people)
American jazz composers
University of North Carolina at Asheville alumni
Musicians from Durham, North Carolina
American jazz bass guitarists
American male bass guitarists
Guitarists from Chicago
Guitarists from North Carolina
Jazz musicians from Illinois
Jazz musicians from North Carolina
American male jazz composers